Ivan Ilich Dolgikh (1904 – 1 October 1961) was a Soviet police officer, politician, and the head of the Gulag system of labour camps from 1951 to 1954.

Career 
Born to a Russian peasant family, in Livensky Uyezd of Oryol Governorate, and educated at Moscow, Dolgikh joined the All-Union Communist Party (b) in 1931, and was appointed a lieutenant in the NKVD in Kharkiv Oblast in February 1936. According to former political prisoner Anton Antonov-Ovseyenko: 

Dolgikh was promoted to the rank of captain in November 1941, and appointed deputy head of the NKVD in Khabarovsk Krai. In 1945, he was appointed head of the NKVD in Khabarovsk Krai. He was head of Gulag in 1951-54. In May 1954, he led the commission which opened negotiations with prisoners at the Kengir labour camp, in Kazakhstan, who had revolted and taken control of the camp. Dolgikh conceded to some minor demands, including the transfer of prison guards who were particularly hated, whilst forbidding food or medicines to be shipped to the camp. The rebellion was violently suppressed (unarmed people including women were crushed by T-34 tanks caterpillars) in June 1954. In 1955-56, Dolgikh was an inspector at the USSR Ministry of Internal Affairs. 

In 1956, shortly after Nikita Khrushchev had denounced the crimes of the Stalin era, in his Secret speech to the 20th Congress of the CPSU. Dolgikh was found guilty of 'flagrant violations of socialist law', sacked, stripped of his rank, and expelled from the Communist Party.

Dolgikh died in 1961.

References 

1904 births
1961 deaths
People from Oryol Oblast
People from Livensky Uyezd (Oryol Governorate)
Expelled members of the Communist Party of the Soviet Union
Third convocation members of the Supreme Soviet of the Soviet Union
People's commissars and ministers of the Kazakh Soviet Socialist Republic
Commissars 3rd Class of State Security
Soviet lieutenant generals
NKVD officers
People of the KGB
Gulag governors
Recipients of the Order of Lenin
Recipients of the Order of the Red Banner
Recipients of the Order of the Red Banner of Labour
Recipients of the Order of the Red Star
Kutafin Moscow State Law University alumni